You County  is a county in Hunan Province, China; it is under the administration of Zhuzhou City. Located on the south eastern margin of the province, the county is bordered to the north by Xiangdong District, Pingxiang City of Jiangxi, Liling City and Zhuzhou County, to the west by Hengdong County, to the south by Chaling County, to the east by Lianhua County of Jiangxi. The county has 13 towns and 4 subdistricts under its jurisdiction, the county seat is at Chunlian Subdistrict.

Subdivisions

Yanling County currently has 4 subdistricts and 13 towns.
4 subdistricts
 Chunlian
 Jiangqiao
 Lianxing
 Tanqiao

13 towns
 Caihuaping
 Huangfengqiao
 Huangtuling
 Jiubujiang
 Liantang'ao
 Luanshan
 Lutian
 Ningjiaping
 Shiyangtang
 Taoshui
 Wangling
 Xinshi
 Yajiangqiao

Climate

Politics
On December 28, 2018, the Communist Party Secretary of You County Tan Runhong has been expelled from the Communist Party of China and removed from public office for serious violations of laws and regulations.

References

www.xzqh.org 

 
County-level divisions of Hunan
Zhuzhou